Professor Andrew John Pask is an epigeneticist and head of the Thylacine Integrated Genomic Restoration Research (TIGRR) Laboratory at the School of BioSciences in the University of Melbourne. He is known for his work on the project to resurrect the extinct thylacine, a marsupial colloquially known as the "Tasmanian tiger".

Pask graduated with a PhD from La Trobe University in 1999, for his thesis "The evolution of genes in the sex determining pathway".

References

External links 

https://findanexpert.unimelb.edu.au/profile/4401-andrew-pask

Living people
Year of birth missing (living people)
Academic staff of the University of Melbourne

La Trobe University alumni